The Kimberley shallow-soil blind snake (Anilios kimberleyensis) is a species of snake in the Typhlopidae family.

References

Anilios
Reptiles described in 1981
Snakes of Australia